Elizabeth Township is one of twenty-three townships in Jo Daviess County, Illinois, USA.  As of the 2010 census, its population was 1,111 and it contained 579 housing units.

Geography

Cities, towns, villages
 Village of Elizabeth.

Cemeteries
The township contains these three cemeteries:
 Log Church.
 Saint Marys.
 Weston.

Major highways
  U.S. Route 20 east towards Woodbine and northwest towards Galena.
  Illinois Route 84 south towards Hanover and northwest towards Galena (concurrent with U.S. Route 20).

Landmarks
 Long Hollow Scenic Overlook (Illinois Department of Transportation).

Demographics

School districts
 River Ridge Community Unit School District 210.

Political districts
 Illinois' 16th congressional district.
 State House District 89.
 State Senate District 45.

References
 
 United States Census Bureau 2007 TIGER/Line Shapefiles.
 United States National Atlas.

External links
 Jo Daviess County official site.
 City-Data.com.
 Illinois State Archives.
 Township Officials of Illinois.

Townships in Jo Daviess County, Illinois
Townships in Illinois